DGC can refer to:

Businesses and organizations
 Darlton Gliding Club, Nottinghamshire, England
 Daybreak Game Company, an American video game developer 
 Delhi Golf Club, Delhi, India
 Deutsche Gesellschaft für Chronometrie, a German organization for the science, art and history of horology
 DGC Records, an American record label
 Directors Guild of Canada, a Canadian labour union
 Dubious Goals Committee, an association football committee, England
 Dublin Gospel Choir, an Irish gospel choir
 Durban Girls' College, Durban, South Africa

Other uses
 DARPA Grand Challenge, a competition for American autonomous vehicles
 Denham Golf Club railway station, Buckinghamshire, England
 Di Gi Charat, a Japanese manga and anime series created by Koge-Donbo
 Digital gold currency, a form of digital currency
 Disc golf course
 Discontinuous gas exchange cycles
 Distributed garbage collection (in computing)
 Dystrophin-glycoprotein complex, aka DGC, DAGC, or dystrophin-associated (glyco)protein complex, connects myofibrils inside a muscle cell to the extracellular matrix, spanning the cell membrane